Zafarobod District (Nohiyai Zafarobod) is a district in Sughd Region, Tajikistan. Its capital is Zafarobod. The population of the district is 75,900 (January 2020 estimate). The entire population of the Yaghnob Valley was forcibly resettled in the Zafarabad region in the 1970s by the Soviets.

Administrative divisions
They are as follows:

References

Districts of Tajikistan
Sughd Region